Shammetovo (Şämmät) is a rural locality (a village) in Akkuzevsky Selsoviet, Ilishevsky District, Bashkortostan, Russia. The population was 236 as of 2010. There are 5 streets.

Geography 
Shammetovo is located 26 km northwest of Verkhneyarkeyevo (the district's administrative centre) by road. Kipchakovo is the nearest rural locality.

References 

Rural localities in Ilishevsky District